Randy MacDonald (born July 26, 1962) is a Canadian stock car racer and a former competitor in the NASCAR Winston Cup Series, Busch Series and Craftsman Truck Series. He is currently team owner of MacDonald Motorsports, which competes in the Nationwide Series. He is the older brother of former NASCAR racer Teri MacDonald.

Early career 
Born in Oshawa, Ontario, MacDonald originally pursued a career in hockey, playing for the Bowmanville Eagles before changing his career path to stock car racing.

MacDonald began racing in his native Canada, and won the Canada ACT Series championship, before moving to North Carolina during the 1990s. He won the American Speed Association Rookie of the Year honors in 1993.

MacDonald made his NASCAR debut in 1986 at Oxford Plains Speedway, finishing 26th after his cooling fan expired. He ran one race apiece over the next few years, before posting his first career top-ten finish at the Goody's 300 in 1991. He ran two races apiece over the next two years in his own #01, his best finish being 16th at Daytona in 1993. After three finishes of 21st or better in 1994, he made his Winston Cup debut that year at North Carolina Speedway, finishing 24th in a car owned by Billy Hagan.

Mid 1990s 
He only ran one race the next year, finishing 23rd at Watkins Glen. In 1996, he declared for NASCAR Winston Cup Rookie of the Year honors, and ran three races for Triad Motorsports, his best finish a 24th at Pocono Raceway, but was unable to make a serious challenge for the top Rookie honor. He also made his Craftsman Truck Series debut that year, finishing 30th at North Wilkesboro Speedway for Manison Motorsports.

In 1997, MacDonald debuted his Truck team at Homestead-Miami Speedway, finishing 25th after suffering mechanical failure. He ran ten races the next year for Dick Greenfield, MB Motorsports, and K Automotive Racing, posting an eighth-place run for Greenfield at Flemington Speedway. He also made his most recent attempt at a Cup race, when he missed the field at Martinsville in the #85 sponsored by Big Daddy's BBQ Sauce. He began 1999 hoping to run full-time with Greenfield, but sponsorship opportunities did not come through, and he ran three races with Marty Walsh and Rick Ware.

2000s 
In 2000, MacDonald got sponsorship on his truck from 3M and was able to make his first full-time schedule in NASCAR, posting a sixth-place run at Daytona and finishing 19th in points. Unfortunately, MacDonald injured his neck during the next season, and was forced to sit out most of the year. MacDonald returned in 2002, and split the year between his own team and Troxell Racing, finishing 19th in points. He followed that up with another full-time bid in 2003, posting eleven top-20 runs and finishing a career-best 15th in points. He also made his return to the Busch Series, running five races and having a best finish of 22nd at Daytona.

In 2004, MacDonald made his last Truck race to date, finishing 21st at Daytona. He ran six more Busch races that year, posting a best finish of 24th at Pikes Peak. He made one start in 2005, and three in 2006, running twice for his own team and other for Jay Robinson Racing. In 2007, he made two starts, exiting both races with handling problems.

Team owner
In 2008, MacDonald switched from the driver's seat to the owner's box, running only 2 races himself. He fielded 26 races with DJ Kennington, getting a best finish of 22nd. Other drivers behind the wheel of the No. 81 in 2008 were Brad Baker, Bryan Clauson, Kevin Hamlin, Bobby Hillin, Jr., Shane Huffman, and PJ Jones. In 2009, 12 different drivers drove the MacDonald Motorsports No. 81. The best result for the team was a 13th-place result by Mike Bliss at Fontana. Michael McDowell became the main driver in 2010, starting 33 of 34 races for MacDonald and the team. Sponsors on the No. 81 included, Mobile-Shop, K-LOVE Radio, and Red Line Oil. MacDonald Motorsports No. 81 ended the year 31st in the owner's standings and McDowell was 21st in the driver's points. Blake Koch drove for the team in 2011; in 2012, American Majority joined as sponsor, with Jason Bowles driving the No. 81.

Motorsports career results

NASCAR
(key) (Bold - Pole position awarded by time. Italics - Pole position earned by points standings. * – Most laps led.)

Winston Cup Series

Nationwide Series

Craftsman Truck Series

See also
List of Canadians in NASCAR

References

External links 
 
 

1962 births
American Speed Association drivers
Ice hockey people from Ontario
Living people
NASCAR drivers
NASCAR team owners
Ontario Junior Hockey League players
Racing drivers from Ontario
Sportspeople from Oshawa
Trans-Am Series drivers